Enis Jackson (born May 16, 1963 in Helena, Arkansas) is a former professional American football player who played defensive back in 1987 for the Cleveland Browns in the National Football League.

External links
Pro-Football-Reference

1963 births
Living people
American football defensive backs
BC Lions players
Cleveland Browns players
Edmonton Elks players
Memphis Tigers football players
People from Helena, Arkansas
Players of American football from Arkansas
Toronto Argonauts players